Jenkinidae is a family of sea sponges in the order Leucosolenida.

References

Leucosolenida
Taxa named by Nicole Boury-Esnault
Taxa named by Jean Vacelet